And the Waltz Goes On  is a studio album by Dutch violinist André Rieu that features Christchurch soprano Hayley Westenra on the last track, "Dreaming of New Zealand".

The album was released worldwide on 31 October 2011. It presents waltzes from around the world, including a "Valse Triste" (sad waltz) from Finland, a miniature waltz "La petite Valse" from France, a popular waltz tune that began life in Germany.

The album is centered on a waltz composed by Welsh actor Anthony Hopkins. The waltz, called "And the Waltz Goes On" was composed by Hopkins in 1964. A fan of the Dutch violinist, Hopkins's wife sent his waltz to Rieu for consideration.

Inspired by New Zealand's stunning landscape and the ‘life must go on’ attitude of its people in the face of the recent natural disasters, André composed a dreamy waltz together with his first violinist Frank Steijns entitled "Dreaming of New Zealand". The album includes both an instrumental version and one with English and Māori lyrics.

The album reached number one on the official UK Classical Charts, as well as the Classic FM chart, after its release in the UK.

On 2 October 2012, The album got the honor of "Classic FM Album Of The Year in association with MasterCard" from Classic Brit Awards 2012.

Track listing
Wiener Festwalzer/Grande Valse Viennoise
Wien wird bei Nacht erst schön
And the Waltz Goes On
Susie/Susie (If you knew Susie)
Dreaming of New Zealand
Wien bleibt Wien/Vienna Forever
Ich muß wieder einmal in Grinzing sein
Tanze mit mir in den Morgen
La petite Valse
Bist du einsam heut' Nacht/Are you lonesome tonight
Du kannst nicht treu sein/You can't be true, dear
Valse Triste
Blue Tango
Singing in the rain
We'll meet again
Waltz Medley
Swan Lake (Moderato)
Edelweiß
The Phantom of the Opera
Dreaming of New Zealand (feat. Hayley Westenra)

International release

Certification

References

2011 albums
Hayley Westenra albums